The , officially the , is a Japanese funicular line in Tateyama, Toyama, operated by Tateyama Kurobe Kankō. The company also operates another funicular with the same official name. The line is a part of Tateyama Kurobe Alpine Route. The line goes entirely under a tunnel to protect it from snow. It opened in 1969.

Basic data
Distance: 
Gauge: 
Stations: 2
Vertical interval:

See also
Mount Tate
List of funicular railways
List of railway lines in Japan

External links
 Tateyama Kurobe Alpine Route official website

Underground funiculars
Funicular railways in Japan
Rail transport in Toyama Prefecture
Tateyama Kurobe Alpine Route
Railway lines opened in 1969
1067 mm gauge railways in Japan
1969 establishments in Japan